Sprked is a free platform dedicated to the curation and recommendation of video games. Game lists are made by video game experts and the service recommends various lists based on the day and mood. It was launched in September 2015.

History
Sprked was originally launched in response to the paid mods controversy. It originally allowed funding for all gaming content but has since transitioned to solely providing a service for game curation, discovery and recommendation.

References

External links 
 sprked.com

Social economy

Crowdsourcing